Russell House was a historic inn located near Mountain Rest, Oconee County, South Carolina. It was built about 1867, and considerably expanded around 1890, and served as an inn for travelers between Walhalla and the mountain resort area. The Russell House, two storage buildings, and a privy were destroyed by fire in 1988. Located on the property are the contributing ruins of a log barn, a spring house, outhouse, garage, corn crib, and potato cellar.

It was added to the National Register of Historic Places in 1988.

References

Hotel buildings on the National Register of Historic Places in South Carolina
Houses completed in 1867
Buildings and structures in Oconee County, South Carolina
National Register of Historic Places in Oconee County, South Carolina